The 1950 Montana State Bobcats football team was an American football team that represented Montana State University in the Rocky Mountain Conference (RMC) during the 1950 college football season. In its first season under head coach John Mason, the team compiled a 1–8 record.

Schedule

References

Montana State
Montana State Bobcats football seasons
Montana State Bobcats football